Tsakana Nkandih is a Namibian beauty queen and model, elected as Miss Namibia 2012 at the Windhoek country club on Saturday night of 4 August 2012. Fifteen finalists participated in the final round.(5 July 2012). Miss Namibia hopefuls, The Namibian She represented Namibia in the Miss Universe 2012 pageant where she was unplaced.

References

External links
 Official Miss Namibia website

Living people
Miss Universe 2012 contestants
Namibian beauty pageant winners
Year of birth missing (living people)
People from Tsumeb